Goodbye Happiness is a Canadian comedy-drama film, directed by Ken Scott and released in 2021. The film centres on Nicolas (François Arnaud), Thomas (Antoine Bertrand), Charles-Alexandre (Louis Morissette) and William (Patrice Robitaille), four brothers who do not get along but are attempting to set aside their differences at their father's funeral.

The cast also includes Julie Le Breton, Charlotte Aubin, Marilyse Bourke, Élizabeth Duperré, Geneviève Boivin-Roussy and Pierre-Yves Cardinal.

The film premiered in theatres on December 17, 2021.

Awards
The film received two Canadian Screen Award nominations at the 10th Canadian Screen Awards in 2022, for Best Editing (Yvann Thibaudeau) and Best Original Song (Nicolas Errèra and Craig Walker for "Drop the Rock").

References

External links

Au revoir le bonheur (version in French with English subtitles) at Library and Archives Canada

2021 films
2021 comedy-drama films
Canadian comedy-drama films
Films shot in Quebec
Films set in Quebec
Films directed by Ken Scott
2020s French-language films
French-language Canadian films
2020s Canadian films